Hanina Karchevsky (1877 - 20 December 1925, age 49), was a Jewish composer, conductor and music teacher who became an important figure in the establishment of the musical culture of the pre-state Yishuv and of Israel.

Biography
Karchevsky was born in 1877 in Petrovka, a village in Russian-ruled Bessarabia. He moved with his parents to the nearby town of Bender, where he studied Torah. At the same time, he learned piano and notation with his teacher, who was also a cantor (hazzan). There he was heard by the well-known cantor, Zeydl Rovner, who convinced his parents to move to Kishinev, so the child could join the synagogue's choir.

At the age of 22 he moved to Warsaw, where he conducted an army orchestra.

As a supporter of Zionism, he immigrated to the Land of Israel in 1908, during the Second Aliyah. He taught music there in several institutes, among them the Herzliya Hebrew Gymnasium, where he founded an orchestra and a choir. The choir performed around the country and participated in the inauguration ceremony of the Hebrew University of Jerusalem.

Karchevsky composed children and pioneer songs, as well as orchestral compositions. His songs became very popular in the period, and became milestones in the history of the pre-state Yishuv's and of Israel's musical culture. He also provided free classes for poor children.

At the end of December 1925, Krachevsky took his own life by hanging himself at his Tel Aviv home. He left behind a mother, and a married sister who was pregnant at the time and a mother to a ten-year-old daughter. The reasons for his suicide remain unclear.

Notes

External links
 Hanina Karchevsky's Music - National Library of Israel: Home to the Israeli Song

1877 births
1925 suicides
Israeli composers
Suicides by hanging in Mandatory Palestine
Burials at Trumpeldor Cemetery
1925 deaths